Mohammed Abed Al Jabri (27 December 1935 – 3 May 2010 Rabat) was one of the most known Moroccan and Arab philosophers; he taught philosophy, Arab philosophy, and Islamic thought in Mohammed V University in Rabat from the late 1960s until his retirement. He is considered one of the major philosophers and intellectual figures in the modern and contemporary Arab world. He is known for his academic project "Critique of Arab Reason", published in four volumes between the 1980s and 2000s. He published several influential books on the Arab philosophical tradition.

Biography
Jabri was born on 27 December 1935 in Figuig, Morocco. he received a bachelor's degree in philosophy from the University of Mohammed V in 1967. He also obtained a PhD in philosophy from the same university in 1970.

Awards
The Ibn Rushd Prize for Freedom of Thought for the year 2008 in Berlin.

Bibliography

Arabic

Translations

English

French
La Pensée de Ibn Khaldoun: la Assabiya et l'État. Grandes lignes d'une théorie Khaldounienne de l'histoire musulmane. Paris: Édima, 1971.
Pour une Vision Progressiste de nos Difficultés Intellectuelles et Éducatives. Paris: Édima, 1977.
Nous et Notre Passé (Al-Marqaz al-taqafi al-arabi). Lecture contemporaine de notre patrimoine philosophique, 1980.
Critique de la Raison Arabe - 3 volumes, Beyrouth, 1982.

German
 Kritik der arabischen Vernunft, Naqd al-'aql al-'arabi,  Die Einführung, Perlen Verlag, Berlin 2009

References

Further reading
 Ibrahim M. Abu-Rabi: Towards a Critical Arab Reason - the Contributions of Mohammed Abed al-Jabri
 Contemporary Arab Thought: Studies in Post-1967 Arab Intellectual History. London, Sterling, Virginia: Pluto Press, 2004.   PP. 256–278.
 Review of German "Introduction" of "Kritik der arabischen Vernunft" (also in German)
 Mohammed Hashas, "Mohammed Abed al-Jabri: the Future of the Arab World?" Resetdoc, 27 December 2014, http://www.resetdoc.org/story/00000022474.
 Zaid Eyadat, Francesca M. Corrao, and Mohammed Hashas, eds. Islam, State, and Modernity: Mohammed Abed al-Jabri and the Future of the Arab World (New York: Palgrave Macmillan, 2018) XXIII, 320 p. https://www.palgrave.com/it/book/9781349951550#aboutAuthors

External links
 Official website
 Sonja Hegasy "Mohammed Abed al-Jabri: Pioneering Figure in a New Arab Enlightenment", 2010
 Sonja Hegasy "Portrait of the Philosopher Mohammed Abed al-Jabri Critique of Arab Reason", 2009
M'hamed Hamrouch, Magress, obituary in French (published in Libération  04 - 05 - 2010)
Nicola Missaglia, "Mohammed Abed al-Jabri's New Averroism" 

1935 births
2010 deaths
Mohammed V University alumni
Academic staff of Mohammed V University
Moroccan writers
Muslim reformers
20th-century Moroccan philosophers
21st-century Moroccan philosophers
People from Figuig
Moroccan scholars
Moroccan male journalists